Henry Sri Mevan Pieris (born 16 February 1946) is a former Sri Lankan cricketer who played first-class and one-day cricket for Sri Lanka from 1970 to 1975.

Life and career
Mevan Pieris was born in Colombo and attended S. Thomas' College, Mount Lavinia, and The University of Colombo, where he studied Science. A right-arm fast-medium bowler and useful left-handed lower-order batsman, he was an expert swing bowler who took wickets consistently for Sri Lankan teams. In the 1969-70 Gopalan Trophy match he made 50 and 50 not out and took 5 for 55 and 1 for 8, bowling all six of his victims. He took 6 for 25 when the Sri Lanka Board President's XI dismissed Pakistan Under-25s for 85 in 1973–74.

Pieris played three One Day International matches at the inaugural World Cup in 1975. An injury to the cartilage in his left knee forced him to quit cricket after the World Cup at the age of 29.

He has worked in industry and academia, teaching Chemistry and specialising in polymers. He served as President of the Plastics and Rubber Institute and President of the Institute of Chemistry Ceylon. In September 2018, he was one of 49 former Sri Lankan cricketers felicitated by Sri Lanka Cricket, to honour them for their services before Sri Lanka became a full member of the International Cricket Council (ICC). He and his wife have a son and a daughter.

References

External links
 

1946 births
Living people
Alumni of S. Thomas' College, Mount Lavinia
Alumni of the University of Colombo
Sri Lankan cricketers
Sri Lanka One Day International cricketers
All-Ceylon cricketers
Cricketers at the 1975 Cricket World Cup